Clayton Family Farm, also known as John and Matthew Clayton Farm, is a historic farm complex and national historic district located at Stanleyville, Forsyth County, North Carolina.  The district encompasses eight contributing buildings and four contributing sites dated between about 1800 and 1931.  They include two historic roadbeds, an historic pond site, the weatherboarded log John Clayton House (c. 1800), the brick Greek Revival style Matthew C. Clayton House (1879), the former Clayton Store, five log and frame outbuildings, and the family cemetery.

It was listed on the National Register of Historic Places in 2001.

References

Farms on the National Register of Historic Places in North Carolina
Historic districts on the National Register of Historic Places in North Carolina
Greek Revival houses in North Carolina
Houses in Forsyth County, North Carolina
National Register of Historic Places in Forsyth County, North Carolina